The third season of Bachelor in Paradise premiered on August 2, 2016. Chris Harrison reprises his role from The Bachelor and The Bachelorette as the host of the show. The season concluded on September 6, 2016.

Contestant Chad Johnson, who was kicked off the show by producers in Week 1, achieved some level of infamy in 2020 due to his arrest for domestic violence and the launch of a career in pornography.

Production
As with the previous season, filming took place in the town of Sayulita, located in Vallarta-Nayarit, Mexico.

Casting
During the Women Tell All special, Lace Morris was offered a spot on the third season of Bachelor in Paradise, which she accepted. 

The initial cast was announced on June 8, 2016, with returning Bachelor and Bachelorette contestants.

Contestants
Source, contestants names:

Elimination table

Key
 The contestant is male.
 The contestant is female.
 The contestant went on a date and gave out a rose at the rose ceremony.
 The contestant went on a date and got a rose at the rose ceremony.
 The contestant gave or received a rose at the rose ceremony, thus remaining in the competition.
 The contestant received the last rose.
 The contestant went on a date and was eliminated.
 The contestant was eliminated. 
 The contestant was eliminated by production.
 The contestant had a date and voluntarily left the show.
 The contestant voluntarily left the show.
 The couple broke up and were eliminated.
 The couple decided to stay together and won the competition.
 The contestant had a wait before appearing in paradise.
 The couple left together to pursue a relationship.

Episodes

Post show
Lace Morris and Grant Kemp ended their engagement in November 2016.

Amanda Stanton and Josh Murray ended their engagement in December 2016. Amanda returned to Paradise for season 4.

Carly Waddell and Evan Bass were married on June 17, 2017, in Mexico. They welcomed their first child, a daughter named Isabella Evelyn, on February 15, 2018. They welcomed their second child, a son named Charles Wolfe, on November 13, 2019.  They announced their separation in 2020

Jared and Ashley became a couple in March 2018, and were engaged in June of that year.  They were married in 2019

References

External links
 
 Information about Riviera Nayarit

Paradise 03
2016 American television seasons
Television shows set in Mexico